Yang Dongsheng (杨东生; né , 协饶登珠) (1918–1982) was a Tibetan politician. He was President of Tibet Autonomous Region People's Congress in 1981–1983. He was succeeded by Ngapoi Ngawang Jigme and was noted for his democratic reforms in Tibet.

External links 
 Democratic reform in Tibet

1918 births
1982 deaths
People's Republic of China politicians from Sichuan
Tibetan politicians
Chinese Communist Party politicians from Sichuan
Politicians from Ngawa
Political office-holders in Tibet